Valeri Mikhailovich Matyunin (20 July 1960 – 9 January 2018) was a Russian professional footballer.

Club career
He made his professional debut in the Soviet Top League in 1979 for FC Dynamo Moscow. After winning the 1984 Soviet Cup with Dynamo, Matyunin had spells with FC Fakel Voronezh, FC Arsenal Tula, FC Spartak Kostroma, FC Dnepr Mogilev, FC Tiligul Tiraspol, FC Kuzbass Kemerovo, FC Gigant Voskresensk and FC Industriya Obninsk.

Honours
 Soviet Cup winner: 1984.
 Soviet Top League runner-up: 1986.

European club competitions
With FC Dynamo Moscow.

 UEFA Cup 1980–81: 2 games.
 UEFA Cup 1982–83: 1 game.
 European Cup Winners' Cup 1984–85: 3 games.

Referee career
After his retirement as a player, he worked as a referee from 1997 to 2005. The highest level he refereed in was the second-tier Russian Football National League.

Personal life
His son Aleksei Matyunin is a FIFA referee.

References

1960 births
2018 deaths
Footballers from Moscow
Soviet footballers
Russian footballers
Association football midfielders
FC Dynamo Moscow players
FC Fakel Voronezh players
FC Arsenal Tula players
FC Dnepr Mogilev players
FC APK Morozovsk players
Soviet Top League players
FC Spartak Kostroma players
Russian football referees